The following is a list of events, births, and deaths in 1849 in Switzerland.

Incumbents
Federal Council:
Ulrich Ochsenbein 
Jonas Furrer (President)
Josef Munzinger 
Henri Druey 
Friedrich Frey-Herosé
Wilhelm Matthias Naeff 
Stefano Franscini

Events 
 A uniform postal service, the Swiss Post, is introduced
 The Museum of Cultures is established

Births 
 March 28 – August Fetscherin, Swiss physician (d. 1882)
 April 12 – Albert Heim, Swiss geologist (d. 1937)
 April 24 – Alfred Kleiner, Swiss physicist (d. 1916)
 May 19 – Adrien Lachenal, Swiss politician (d. 1918)
 May 22 – Louis Perrier, member of the Swiss Federal Council (d. 1913)
 December 29 – Otto Stoll, Swiss linguist and ethnologist (d. 1922)

No known date 
 Albert Butz, Swiss-American inventor and businessman (d. 1905)

Deaths 
 January 6 – Johann Caspar von Orelli, Swiss classical scholar (b. 1787)
 May 18 – Samuel Amsler, Swiss engraver (b. 1791)
 August 12 – Albert Gallatin, Swiss-American politician (b. 1761)
 November 14 – Karl Adams, Swiss mathematician (b. 1811)
 December 27 – Jacques-Laurent Agasse, Swiss animal and landscape painter (b. 1767)

No known date 
 Marie Manning, Swiss domestic servant and murderer (b. 1821)
 Édouard Bovet, Swiss watchmaker (b. 1797)
 Frédéric Fregevize, Swiss landscape painter (b. 1770)

 
Years of the 19th century in Switzerland